The 2008–09 Nashville Predators season began on October 10, 2008. It was the Nashville Predators' 11th season in the National Hockey League. The Predators ended up missing the playoffs for the first time since 2002-03 season

Pre-season

Regular season

Divisional standings

Conference standings

Game log

Playoffs
The Nashville Predators failed to qualify for the 2009 Stanley Cup playoffs, making it the first time that the Predators missed the playoffs since 2003.

Player stats

Skaters

Goaltenders

†Denotes player spent time with another team before joining Predators. Stats reflect time with the Predators only.
‡Traded mid-season
Bold/italics denotes franchise record

Awards and records

Records

Milestones

Transactions

Trades

Free agents

Claimed via waivers

Draft picks
Nashville's picks at the 2008 NHL Entry Draft in Ottawa, Ontario.

See also
2008–09 NHL season

Farm teams

References

Nashville Predators seasons
N
N